Ornithomerus is a genus of iguanodont dinosaurs from the Late Cretaceous.

Discovery and species
In 1859 coal mine administrator Pawlowitsch notified the University of Vienna that some fossils had been found in the Gute Hoffnung mine at Muthmannsdorf in Austria. A team headed by geologists Eduard Suess and Ferdinand Stoliczka subsequently uncovered numerous bones of several species, among them those of a euornithopod dinosaur. Stored at the university museum, the finds remained undescribed until they were studied by Emanuel Bunzel from 1870 onwards. Bunzel in 1871 referred PIUW 2349/3 (identified by him as a thoracal rib) to Lacerta sp. In 1881 Harry Govier Seeley recognized PIUW 2349/3 as a femur belonging to Dinosauria and erected the new genus and species Ornithomerus gracilis for it. The generic name is derived from Greek ornithos, "bird", and meros, "shin". Norman and Weishampel (1990) and Norman (2004) listed Ornithomerus, along with Oligosaurus and Mochlodon, as a synonym of Rhabdodon. However, Sachs and Hornung (2006) assigned Ornithomerus to Zalmoxes sp. along with the Mochlodon suessi holotype.

The type specimen PIUW 2349/3 was found in the Grünbach Formation of the Gosau Group dating from the Lower Campanian, about 80 million years old.

References 

Iguanodonts
Ornithischian genera
Campanian life
Late Cretaceous dinosaurs of Europe
Cretaceous Austria
Fossils of Austria
Fossil taxa described in 1881
Taxa named by Harry Seeley